The following are the national records in Olympic weightlifting in Russia. Records are maintained in each weight class for the snatch lift, clean and jerk lift, and the total for both lifts by the Russian Weightlifting Federation (Федерация тяжелой атлетики России).

Current records
Key to tables:

Men

Women

Historical records

Men (1998–2018)

Women (1998–2018)

References
General
Russian records – Men 8 July 2022 updated
Russian records – Women 8 July 2022 updated
Specific

External links
Russian Weightlifting Federation

 
Russia
Records
Olympic weightlifting
weightlifting